Daughter Angele is a 1918 American silent comedy-drama film, directed by William C. Dowlan.

Plot

Cast
Pauline Starke as Angele
Walt Whitman as Anthony Brenton
Eugene Burr as Frank Chumnige (as Gene Burr)
Myrtle Rishell
Philo McCullough
Lule Warrenton
Harold Holland
Julia Mackley

References

External links
 
 

1918 films
1918 comedy-drama films
1910s English-language films
American silent feature films
American black-and-white films
Films about orphans
Films directed by William C. Dowlan
Films shot in Los Angeles
Triangle Film Corporation films
1910s American films
Silent American comedy-drama films